Inquiry education (sometimes known as the inquiry method) is a student-centered method of education focused on asking questions. Students are encouraged to ask questions which are meaningful to them, and which do not necessarily have easy answers; teachers are encouraged to avoid giving answers when this is possible, and in any case to avoid giving direct answers in favor of asking more questions. In this way it is similar in some respects to the Socratic method. The method was advocated by Neil Postman and Charles Weingartner in their book Teaching as a Subversive Activity.

Overview
The inquiry method is motivated by Postman and Weingartner's recognition that good learners and sound reasoners center their attention and activity on the dynamic process of inquiry itself, not merely on the end product of static knowledge. They write that certain characteristics are common to all good learners (Postman and Weingartner, pp. 31–33), saying that all good learners have:
 Self-confidence in their learning ability
 Pleasure in problem solving
 A keen sense of relevance
 Reliance on their own judgment over other people's or society's
 No fear of being wrong
 No haste in answering
 Flexibility in point of view
 Respect for facts, and the ability to distinguish between fact and opinion
 No need for final answers to all questions, and comfort in not knowing an answer to difficult questions rather than settling for a simplistic answer

In an attempt to instill students with these qualities and behaviors, a teacher adhering to the inquiry method in pedagogy must behave very differently from a traditional teacher. Postman and Weingartner suggest that inquiry teachers have the following characteristics (pp. 34–37):
 They avoid telling students what they "ought to know".
 They talk to students mostly by questioning, and especially by asking divergent questions.
 They do not accept short, simple answers to questions.
 They encourage students to interact directly with one another, and avoid judging what is said in student interactions.
 They do not summarize students' discussion.
 They do not plan the exact direction of their lessons in advance, and allow it to develop in response to students' interests.
 Their lessons pose problems to students.
 They gauge their success by change in students' inquiry behaviors (with the above characteristics of "good learners" as a goal).

References
 Postman, Neil, and Weingartner, Charles (1969), Teaching as a Subversive Activity, Dell, New York, NY.

Further reading
 Awbrey, Jon, and Awbrey, Susan (1995), "Interpretation as Action:  The Risk of Inquiry", Inquiry: Critical Thinking Across the Disciplines 15, 40–52.  Eprint

Alternative education
Educational psychology
Pedagogy
Inquiry